Mediavia phaebadia is a species of snout moth in the genus Mediavia. It was described by Schaus in 1925. It is found in South America.

References

Moths described in 1925
Epipaschiinae